FC Astana is a Kazakh professional football club based in Astana.

This list encompasses the major records set by the club and their players in the Kazakhstan Premier League. The player records section includes details of the club's goalscorers and those who have made more than 50 appearances in first-team competitions.

Player

Most appearances 

Players played over 50 competitive, professional matches only. Appearances as substitute (goals in parentheses) included in total.

Goal scorers 

Competitive, professional matches only, appearances including substitutes appear in brackets.

Clean sheets 

Competitive, professional matches only, appearances including substitutes appear in brackets.

Internationals
Players who have played for their country before or during their time with Lokomotiv Astana/Astana. Players who earnt a cap whilst playing for Astana are marked in Bold,

Kazakhstan 

CAF

AFC

CONCACAF

UEFA

Team

Record wins
Record win 
7–0 v Atyrau (9 September 2017)
Record League win 
7–0 v Atyrau (9 September 2017)
Record home win 
7–0 v Atyrau (9 September 2017)
Record away win 
6–1 v Irtysh Pavlodar (7 April 2018)
Record Cup win
4–0 v Vostok (1 May 2013)
4–0 v Tobol (18 June 2014)
Record Super Cup win
3–0 v Kairat (4 March 2018)
Record European win
5–1 v Valletta (8 August 2019)

Record defeats
Record defeat 
6–0 v AZ Alkmaar (24 October 2019)
Record League defeat 
5–0 v Irtysh Pavlodar (26 May 2011)
Record home defeat 
0–5 v AZ Alkmaar (7 November 2019)
Record away defeat 
6–0 v AZ Alkmaar (24 October 2019)
Record Cup defeat 
3–0 v Kairat (7 November 2021)
3–0 v Kairat (20 November 2021)
Record Super Cup defeat 
2–0 v Kairat (4 March 2017)
Record European defeat 
6–0 v AZ Alkmaar (24 October 2019)

Wins/draws/losses in a season
 Most wins in a league season 25 – 2017
 Most draws in a league season 10 – 2014
 Most defeats in a league season 10 – 2010
 Fewest wins in a league season 11 – 2020
 Fewest draws in a league season 0 – 2009
 Fewest defeats in a league season 3 – 2021

Goals
 Most League goals scored in a season 74 – 2017
 Fewest League goals scored in a season 32 – 2020
 Most League goals conceded in a season 37 – 2011
 Fewest League goals conceded in a season 21 – 2016, 2017, 2020

Points
 Most points in a season
77 in 33 matches, 2018 Kazakhstan Premier League
 Fewest points in a season
33 in 32 matches, 2011 Kazakhstan Premier League

References

External links 

FC Astana
FC Astana